Isaac of Norwich or Isaac ben Eliav was a Jewish-English financier of the twelfth and thirteenth centuries. He was among the Jews imprisoned by King John of England in 1210. It is possible that at this time a house of his in London fell into the hands of the king and was afterward (1214) transferred to the Earl of Derby. He was by far the most important Jewish money-lender at Norwich in the early years of Henry III, the majority of the items of a day-book of that place now preserved at Westminster Abbey referring to his transactions. In the "Shetarot" Isaac is referred to as "Nadib" or "Mæcenas". He appears to have died before 1247. A caricature of him appears in an issue of the Exchequer, 17, Hen. III. (1233), which represents him as being tortured by a demon and expresses the contemporary Christian view of his rapaciousness. The accompanying caricature represents Isaac as three-faced, probably in allusion to the wide extent of his dealings. He is crowned with a coronet, and surveys a scene in which two other Jews, Mosse Mok and a woman named Abigail, are being tortured by demons, seemingly under his direction. The scene appears to be taken from a miracle-play, the drapery representing the stage, and the architectural adornment the cloister of a church, such plays generally being performed in churches.  The document, which was on display in the 2019 museum exhibition Jews, Money, Myth, is said to be the world's oldest antisemitic caricature.

Notes
 "Select Pleas of the Jewish Exchequer," ed. Riggs, p. 3.
 "Rotuli Cartarum," p. 3, London, 1837. 
 Jacobs and Wolf, "Bibl. Anglo-Jud." p. xviii. 
 Davis, "Shetarot," Nos. 1-2)
 ibid. No. 11)
 F. Devon, "Issues of the Exchequer," frontispiece, and p. 506, London, 1837)

References

Additional sources

English bankers
13th-century English businesspeople
12th-century English Jews
Businesspeople from Norwich
Medieval bankers
Economy of medieval England
Christian antisemitism in the Middle Ages
13th-century English Jews